Outsiders is an American television drama series created by Peter Mattei. Set in the fictional town of Blackburg; within Crockett County, Kentucky, the series tells the story of the Farrell clan and their struggle for power and control in the hills of Appalachia. It is WGN America's third original series, which debuted on January 26, 2016. On March 11, 2016, WGN America renewed Outsiders for a second season which premiered on January 24, 2017. On April 14, 2017, WGN America announced that the series had been canceled after two seasons, with the then forthcoming last episode of the second season airing as a series finale on the channel.

Synopsis
Set in the Appalachian Mountains of Kentucky, the series revolves around the interaction of a group of mountain folk known as the Farrell clan and the locals in the nearby town of Blackburg, Kentucky.

The Farrells are an isolationist group, who shun normal society and live a spartan existence in the woods. Extremely paranoid of outsiders, the family controls a mountain coveted by a national mining outfit for its coal deposits.

At the start of the series, Asa Farrell, a cousin of the ruling family, returns to the mountains after leaving ten years prior in order to experience life amongst normal society. His arrival coincides with the family matriarch Lady Ray Farrell announcing her intention to cede power to her son, "Big Foster" Farrell. Big Foster, who never forgave Asa for leaving his family, has Asa imprisoned in a cage for six months until he is freed due to his ability to read after an eviction notice is posted at the entrance of the mountain.

In town, the mining company has gained approval to evict the Farrell family from the mountain and seeks to expedite the process so mining operations can begin as soon as possible. Deputy Sheriff Wade Houghton is assigned the task to carry out the eviction process. Deputy Sheriff Houghton however, suffers from alcoholism, opiate addiction, and PTSD due to previous encounters with the violent and cold-blooded Farrell family, and the death of his wife. Houghton attempts to warn his superiors that any sort of eviction process will be bloody, result in loss of life on both sides, and will eventually devolve into a lengthy siege with the Farrells holding the advantage through their extensive knowledge of the mountains.

The eviction leads to a power struggle, as Lady Ray believes that the impending eviction is the apocalyptic event that the family believes in per a family prophecy. Because of this, she pardons Asa, freeing him from the cage and announces a delay in turning over authority to her son.  She continues to refuse to change her mind when Big Foster, upset at being denied power, arranges a raid in town of a local gun owner that goes badly and costs the life of Big Foster's youngest son.

Cast and characters

Main
 David Morse as "Big Foster" Farrell VI, the most powerful male on the hill, and next in line to be Bren'in, the Farrells’ leader. When denied his right of ascension, Farrell takes dangerous action to secure his power and to try to eliminate Asa, whom he considers to be a traitor to his family.
 Joe Anderson as Asa Farrell, Big Foster's cousin, who left Shay Mountain and returns home after a ten-year absence. He was once in love with Lil Foster's lover G'Win, which creates tension as she attempts to help reintegrate him into the tribe.
 Gillian Alexy as G'Winveer "G'Win" Farrell, Asa's third cousin and former lover. Currently involved with "Lil Foster", but seeks to help her former lover return to the family. Had a child who is now deceased with 'Lil' Foster.
 Ryan Hurst as "Lil Foster" Farrell VIII, Big Foster's eldest son and enforcer and current boyfriend of G'Win who's also his third cousin. 
 Kyle Gallner as Hasil Farrell, Asa's fourth cousin, who was maimed by Big Foster after he stole some of the family's wine/moonshine to sell to a drug dealer, who bought him a drink when he snuck into town one night. Having lived most of his life on the mountain, Hasil wishes to know more about the civilized world, much to Big Foster's anger and dismay. He's fallen in love with Sally-Ann, a black resident of Blackburg. 
 Christina Jackson as Sally-Ann, one of the few African-American residents in Blackburg.  Sally-Ann strikes up a relationship with Hasil, much to the anger of her brother, who does not want his sister to associate with a white man.
 Thomas M. Wright as Deputy Sheriff Wade Houghton, Jr. A fifth-generation Houghton to live in Blackburg, second-in-command of the local sheriff's department, and a single father, Houghton is given the assignment of evicting the Farrells from their mountain fortress, a task he fears due to a past encounter his father, a coal company line boss, had with the Farrells that Wade believed caused his father's death. This incident led to Wade developing a great fear of the mountain clan. Suffers from PTSD and alcoholism, and takes unprescribed pills as a result of said encounter.

Recurring
 Phyllis Somerville as Lady Ray Farrell, Big Foster's mother and the former Bren'in. Believed by the members of her clan to have special abilities.
 Jason McCune as Ned Osborn
 Francie Swift as Haylie Grimes
 Mark Jeffrey Miller as Craigan "Krake" O'Farrell, runner of the still and maker of Farrell Wine
 Eddie Beveridge as Phil'up Farrell
 Keith Michael Gregory as Jake Murphy
 Johanna McGinley as Annalivia Farrell, the caretaker to the Lady Bren'in.
 Barret Hackney as Butch the town drug dealer
 Kendall Yeaman as Phelia Farrell, the eyes and ears of the Farrell Clan

Production
The series, first titled Titans, was created by playwright Peter Mattei, and produced by Peter Tolan and Paul Giamatti for Sony Pictures Television and Tribune Studios. WGN America announced a 13-episode straight-to-series order in August 2014. Production began in the Pittsburgh metropolitan area on May 5, 2015 and ran through September. Mountaintop exteriors were filmed in Henry Kaufmann Family Park in Monroeville, Pennsylvania, while interiors were constructed at 31st Street Studios in the Strip District. Scenes in Blackburg, Kentucky, the fictional town at the base of the mountain, were filmed in Millvale. WGN America renewed the series for a second season. Production resumed in mid-2016 using the same locations around Pittsburgh.

Series overview

Episodes

Season 1 (2016)

Season 2 (2017)

Reception

Reviews
On review aggregator Metacritic, Outsiders holds a score of 63/100, based on 17 critics, indicating "generally favorable reviews." On Rotten Tomatoes, the first season has an approval rating of 78%, stating "Outsiders gritty performances keeps the backwoods drama intriguing, even when the story gets stuck in the mud."

References

External links
  (archived)
 
 

2010s American drama television series
2016 American television series debuts
2017 American television series endings
English-language television shows
Serial drama television series
Television series by Sony Pictures Television
WGN America original programming
Television shows set in Kentucky